Kopra is a surname. Notable people with the surname include:
 Jukka Kopra (born 1967), Finnish politician
 Timothy Kopra (born 1963), American astronaut